Stanislav Eremin (born 23 June 1985) is a Russian volleyball player, a member of Russia men's national volleyball team and Russian club Dinamo LO.

Career
Since 2014 he has been playing in Lokomotiv Novosibirsk. In April 2015 he extended his contract.

References

1985 births
Living people
Russian men's volleyball players
Place of birth missing (living people)
Ural Ufa volleyball players